Geertruid Adriaansdochter (?? in Wormer – 1573 in IJpesloot near Amsterdam), was a Dutch farmer. She was hanged by Protestant farmers as a Catholic when she attempted to bring food to her brother, a Catholic priest in Amsterdam, who was at the point under siege by the Protestants. She was used in the propaganda during the war as a Catholic martyr.

See also 
 Catholic Church in the Netherlands

References 
 http://www.inghist.nl/Onderzoek/Projecten/DVN/lemmata/data/Adriaansdr
 Maarten Hell, Adriaansdr., Geertruid, in: Digitaal Vrouwenlexicon van Nederland. URL: http://resources.huygens.knaw.nl/vrouwenlexicon/lemmata/data/Adriaansdr [13/01/2014] 

1573 deaths
Dutch people of the Eighty Years' War
Executed Dutch women
Lynching deaths
Year of birth unknown
Victims of anti-Catholic violence
Catholic martyrs
People from Wormerland
Executed Dutch people
16th-century executions